Magnus Mainland (November 9, 1879 – September 4, 1959) was a college football lineman and college basketball player and founding coach for The University of Texas at Austin. Mainland was a native of Scotland. Mainland was a nationally known basketball player as an undergraduate student at Wheaton College (Illinois). His Wheaton team was able to compete in the college basketball competition in the 1904 Summer Olympics in St. Louis, the first Olympic Games featuring the young sport (although only as a demonstration sport). Wheaton placed second out of the three competing college basketball teams. Following his graduation from Wheaton, Mainland enrolled in engineering courses at The University of Texas. While a student there, he was able to convince University officials to permit him to organize, coach, and play on the University's first varsity basketball team. The Longhorns took the court for the first time on March 10, 1906, defeating the Baylor Bears 27–17 at outdoor Clark Field. Texas won seven of the eight games scheduled in its inaugural season. Mainland's second and final season as head coach resulted in a 4–4 overall record. Due to inadequate funding, the University Athletics Council canceled the basketball program after two seasons, leaving Texas without a basketball team for 1908. The program was reinstated in 1909 under the direction of UT German studies faculty member and previous Longhorn football head coach (1907–08) W. E. Metzenthin, who had supported students in their efforts to have the program revived.

Head coaching record

References

External links
 

1879 births
1959 deaths
American men's basketball coaches
American men's basketball players
College men's basketball head coaches in the United States
Texas Longhorns football players
Texas Longhorns men's basketball coaches
Texas Longhorns men's basketball players
British emigrants to the United States